Dorothy McEwen Kildall, often known as Dorothy McEwen, (1943–2005) was an American microcomputer industry pioneer. In 1974, she co-founded Digital Research, the company that developed the first computer language, the first compiler and the first mainstream operating system for microcomputers.

Early years and education
Dorothy McEwen was born on 3 March 1943 in Seattle, Washington, USA. She was the daughter of Marion Strout and Gene McEwen.

After high school she attended the University of Washington. After a few years, she abandoned studies and for the next several years, she worked to support her husband as he went to the same university.

Professional career
McEwen Kildall cofounded Digital Research, managing the company's marketing and daily operations. In 1980, she was involved in IBM's unsuccessful attempt to license CP/M for the IBM Personal Computer. In 1983, the company's revenue was $44.6 million and CP/M had become the standard operating system on most microcomputers. In 1991, Gary Kildall sold the company to Novell for $120 million.

Personal life 
McEwen married her high school mate Gary Kildall. In 1969, the couple moved to the Monterey Peninsula and she gave birth to her son Scott Kildall in 1969 and her daughter Karen Kildall in 1971. The marriage separated in 1983, and was later divorced. 

She cofounded the Carmel Valley Angel Project and the Community Thanksgiving.

She served on the Board of Directors for the Pacific Grove Heritage Society and the Intersea Foundation, the Carmel Red Cross, Carmel Valley Recreation and Park District, Carmel Valley Chamber of Commerce and Animal Welfare Information and Assistance.

She volunteered in many organizations, including:

 Carmel Valley Village Improvement Committee
 Carmel Valley Women's Club
 Pacific Grove Art Center
 The Suicide Prevention Center
 The Boy Scouts and Girl Scouts
 The Society for the Prevention of Cruelty to Animals
 The Pacific Grove Unified School District

In 1989, she bought the Holman Ranch, a 400-acre plot of land in Carmel Valley. She rebuilt its Spanish-style architecture transforming it into a winery and a site for weddings, corporate parties, photo shoots and charity events, and she built an equestrian center.

Death 
McEwen died in Carmel Valley on January 31, 2005, from brain cancer.

See also
 Gary Kildall
 Scott Kildall
 Digital Research
 CP/M
 Carmel Valley Village, California

References

1943 births
2005 deaths
Digital Research employees
CP/M people
Deaths from cancer
20th-century American women
20th-century American people